József Bodor (January 1, 1927 – 17 July 2000) was a Hungarian sprint canoer who competed in the early 1950s. He won a silver medal in the C-2 1000 m event at the 1954 ICF Canoe Sprint World Championships in Mâcon.

Bodor also finished fifth in the C-2 1000 m event at the 1952 Summer Olympics in Helsinki.

References

Sports-reference.com profile

1927 births
2000 deaths
Canoeists at the 1952 Summer Olympics
Hungarian male canoeists
Olympic canoeists of Hungary
ICF Canoe Sprint World Championships medalists in Canadian
20th-century Hungarian people